Big Mishra Pedha or Mishra Peda is a manufacturer of Indian sweets and snacks, headquartered in Hubli, Karnataka. Currently there are more than 50 branches in Hubli, and also in Gadag, Davanagere, Shimoga, Pune, Goa, etc.

Background
Avadhbhihari Mishra is the founder of Mishra Pedha. When he moved to Dharwad in 1933, he initially produced Pedha in a small scale. His son Ganesh Mishra expanded the business & started producing Pedha in Hubli.

See also
 List of snack foods from the Indian subcontinent

References

Confectionery companies of India
Fast-food chains of India
Dharwad district